Josef Macháček (born 13 March 1957) is a Czech four-wheeler motorcycle rider and rally raid driver. He won the 2009 Dakar Rally in the quad category and the 2021 Dakar Rally in the lightweight prototype category, the first rider to do in both categories. He is the oldest winner of Dakar Rally.

References

People from Chrudim
1957 births
Living people
Enduro riders
Czech rally drivers
Czech motorcycle racers
Dakar Rally motorcyclists
Dakar Rally winning drivers
Off-road motorcycle racers
Sportspeople from the Pardubice Region